Ryan Andrews may refer to:
 Ryan Andrews (director) (born 1981), Welsh film and music video director
 Ryan Andrews (actor) (born 1993), Irish actor
 Ryan Andrews (footballer) (born 2004), English footballer